Caíque Venâncio Lemes (born July 12, 1993), simply known as Caíque, is a Brazilian footballer who plays as a forward for a V.League 1 club Viettel.

Honours

Club
Guarani
 Campeonato Paulista Série A2: 2018

References

External links
 Caíque's info at Thai league official website – thaileague.co.th.
 

1993 births
Living people
Brazilian footballers
Association football forwards
Chiangmai F.C. players
Viettel FC players
Thai League 1 players
V.League 1 players
Brazilian expatriate footballers
Brazilian expatriate sportspeople in Thailand
Brazilian expatriate sportspeople in Vietnam
Expatriate footballers in Thailand
Expatriate footballers in Vietnam
People from Varginha, Minas Gerais
Sportspeople from Minas Gerais